Jonathan Bruce Gillies (born January 22, 1994) is an American professional ice hockey goaltender for the Cleveland Monsters in the American Hockey League (AHL) while under contract to the Columbus Blue Jackets of the National Hockey League (NHL).

Playing career
As a youth, Gillies played in the 2007 Quebec International Pee-Wee Hockey Tournament with the Middlesex Islanders minor ice hockey team, along with teammates Matt Grzelcyk and Miles Wood.

Gillies played collegiate hockey with the Providence Friars in the NCAA Men's Division I Hockey East conference. In his freshman year, Gillies's outstanding play was rewarded with a selection to the 2012–13 All-Hockey East First Team. He was the starting goaltender for the United States at the 2014 World Juniors and played nearly every minute of the tournament, but failed to medal. During his junior season, Gillies led the Friars to the NCAA title, being chosen as the Frozen Four Most Outstanding Player.

On April 15, 2015, Gillies ended his collegiate career by signing a three-year entry level contract with the Calgary Flames.

On April 6, 2017, Gillies played his first NHL game of his career against the Los Angeles Kings. After stopping 27 shots, he recorded his first NHL career win, 4–1. He did not play during the Flames' short-lived playoff run and was assigned to their American Hockey League affiliate, the Stockton Heat, to help them finish their playoff season.

On October 9, 2020, Gilles signed as a free agent from the Flames to a one-year, two-way contract with the St. Louis Blues. After attending the Blues shortened training camp, Gillies was assigned to shared AHL affiliate, the Utica Comets for the 2020–21 season, registering 3 wins in 5 games.

With the 2021–22 season underway, Gillies belatedly signed as a free agent with the Maine Mariners of the ECHL on October 27, 2021. Remaining close to home and after making a lone appearance with the Mariners, Gilles was signed to a PTO with AHL affiliate, the Providence Bruins. He collected 3 wins in as many appearances before returning to the Mariners. On November 23, 2021, Gilles returned to the AHL after agreeing to a PTO with the Lehigh Valley Phantoms of the AHL, affiliate to the Philadelphia Flyers. He played in a solitary game with the Phantoms before he was signed by his former NHL club, the St. Louis Blues, on a one-year, two-way contract on December 9, 2021. He immediately was promoted to join the Blues roster, to help cover through a spate of injury woes for the team. He made his first NHL appearance in four years, debuting with the Blues in saving 36 of 39 shots of a 3–2 overtime defeat to the Anaheim Ducks on December 12, 2021. After his lone appearance with the Blues, Gillies's whirlwind season continued as he was traded by the Blues to the New Jersey Devils in exchange for future considerations on December 15.

On July 13, 2022, Gillies was signed as a free agent to a one-year, two-way contract with the Arizona Coyotes.

On March 2, 2023, while with the Tucson Roadrunners, the Coyotes traded Gillies to the Columbus Blue Jackets in exchange for Jakub Voráček and a sixth-round pick in the 2023 NHL Entry Draft.

Personal life
Gillies was born in Concord, New Hampshire and raised in South Portland, Maine, and comes from a hockey family. His grandfather, Bruce Sr., played at Norwich University. His father, Bruce, not only played at the University of New Hampshire, where he is a member of the school's Hall of Fame, but in the International Hockey League where he led the Muskegon Lumberjacks to the Turner Cup championship in 1985–86 and met his future wife, Debbie. His uncle, Chris, was a goalie at the University of Denver.

Career statistics

Regular season and playoffs

International

Awards and honors

References

External links 
 

1994 births
Living people
AHCA Division I men's ice hockey All-Americans
American men's ice hockey goaltenders
Indiana Ice players
Calgary Flames draft picks
Calgary Flames players
New Jersey Devils players
Sportspeople from South Portland, Maine
Ice hockey people from Maine
Ice hockey people from New Hampshire
Lehigh Valley Phantoms players
Maine Mariners (ECHL) players
Providence Bruins players
Providence Friars men's ice hockey players
St. Louis Blues players
Stockton Heat players
Tucson Roadrunners players
Utica Comets players